Arystan Bab Mausoleum (Kazakh: Арыстан Баб мазары) is a mausoleum in Kazakhstan close to the village of Kogam and Otrartobe.

History
A legend states that Emir Timur ordered the construction of a mosque on the site of Ahmet Yesevi's grave but all attempts were unsuccessful. Timur was then told in a dream that in order to have success, he should first build a mausoleum over  the grave of religious mystic, Arystan Baba.

The mausoleum dates back to the 14th century and is constructed over Arystan Bab's 12th-century grave, but was reconstructed several times up to the 18th century. In the 18th century the previous mausoleum, which had been destroyed by an earthquake was replaced with a double domed structure supported by two carved wooden columns. Most of the current structure was constructed in the first decade of the 20th century with only the carved wooden pillars, remaining from the original building.

Description

The mausoleum features a large central arch and wide front facade with minarets at the ends and two large domes to the left of the main arch. As well as the two-chambered table-tomb (gurkhana) of Arystan Bab and three of his students, Hermet-Azyra, Karga-Baba and Lashyn-Baba, a mosque and auxiliary quarters and museum are located in the other rooms of the mausoleum. The effect of high groundwater levels led to the mosque being demolished and rebuilt in 1971. A quran showing medieval calligraphy is displayed under glass here.

The mausoleum is today a place of pilgrimage.

Arystan Bab

According to legends, Arystan Bab, a religious mystic, was the recipient of Mohammad's amanat beads or persimmon pip. When he was in Sayram, he passed these on to the eleven-year-old Khoja Ahmed Yasawi, who then became his pupil. The people treat Arystan Bab as a Saint (Aulie). So every Thursday, pilgrims spend the night at his grave and say prayers. A popular expression is widely spread: "spend the night at Arystan Bab, ask Khoja Ahmed". According to legends, Arystan Bab lived for over 400 years.

References

Mausoleums in Kazakhstan
Turkistan Region